The discography of Japanese recording artist Jin Akanishi.

Studio albums

Extended plays

Singles

Promotional singles

Other charted songs

Video albums

Other appearances
The following songs are recordings crediting Jin Akanishi as a soloist, that and have not appeared on a release by him.

Notes

References

Discographies of Japanese artists
Pop music discographies
Discography